Sar Firuzabad or Sar-e Firuzabad may refer to:
Sar-e Firuzabad, Kermanshah
Sar Firuzabad, Lorestan
Sar Firuzabad Rural District, in Kermanshah Province